Blastobasis quaintancella is a moth in the family Blastobasidae. It is found in the eastern United States, including Maine and Florida.

The larvae feed on the fruits of Malus species.

References

Moths described in 1910
Blastobasis
Moths of North America